Hornet Township is a township in Beltrami County, Minnesota, United States. The population was 227 as of the 2000 census.

Geography

The city of Funkley is entirely within this township geographically but is a separate entity.

Major highway
  U.S. Route 71

Lakes
 Borden Lake

Adjacent townships
 Shooks Township (north)
 Nore Township, Itasca County (east)
 Moose Park Township, Itasca County (southeast)
 Summit Township (south)
 Hines Township (southwest)
 Langor Township (west)
 Cormant Township (northwest)

Demographics
As of the census of 2000, there were 227 people, 80 households, and 64 families residing in the township.  The population density was 6.3 people per square mile (2.4/km2).  There were 106 housing units at an average density of 3.0/sq mi (1.1/km2).  The racial makeup of the township was 93.83% White, 1.32% Native American, 0.44% Asian, and 4.41% from two or more races. Hispanic or Latino of any race were 1.32% of the population.

There were 80 households, out of which 38.8% had children under the age of 18 living with them, 63.8% were married couples living together, 12.5% had a female householder with no husband present, and 20.0% were non-families. 13.8% of all households were made up of individuals, and 3.8% had someone living alone who was 65 years of age or older.  The average household size was 2.84 and the average family size was 3.11.

In the township the population was spread out, with 29.5% under the age of 18, 8.4% from 18 to 24, 20.7% from 25 to 44, 31.3% from 45 to 64, and 10.1% who were 65 years of age or older.  The median age was 36 years. For every 100 females, there were 120.4 males.  For every 100 females age 18 and over, there were 110.5 males.

The median income for a household in the township was $36,250, and the median income for a family was $39,167. Males had a median income of $26,667 versus $21,786 for females. The per capita income for the township was $14,578.  About 15.7% of families and 22.6% of the population were below the poverty line, including 29.7% of those under the age of eighteen and 7.4% of those 65 or over.

References
 United States National Atlas
 United States Census Bureau 2007 TIGER/Line Shapefiles
 United States Board on Geographic Names (GNIS)

Townships in Beltrami County, Minnesota
Townships in Minnesota